Helga Schneider (born Steinberg, now in Poland 17 November 1937) is an Italian writer of German origin. She was the recipient of the Rapallo Carige Prize for II rogo di Berlino in 1996.

The 2017 biopic Let me go, directed by Scottish director and screenwriter Polly Steele, premiered at the Edinburgh International Film Festival.

Books by Helga Schneider 

 Let Me Go (2001) Translated from the Italian by Shaun Whiteside
 The Bonfire of Berlin: A Lost Childhood in Wartime Germany  (2005) Translated from the Italian by Shaun Whiteside

References

Italian women novelists
20th-century Italian women writers
20th-century Italian novelists
21st-century Italian women writers
21st-century Italian novelists
German emigrants to Italy
1937 births
Living people